Everwood is an American television drama series that premiered on The WB on September 16, 2002. It ran for four seasons and ended on June 5, 2006 with 89 episodes produced. Each episode began with a traditional "previously on..." recap of prior events, which preceded the opening sequence, and most of the episodes were narrated by one character. The series' fourth and final season concluded with a two-hour finale.

Series overview

Episodes

Season 1 (2002–03)

Season 2 (2003–04)

Season 3 (2004–05)

Season 4 (2005–06)

U.S. ratings

References 

General references

External links
 

Lists of American teen drama television series episodes